National Emergency Management Agency may refer to multiple management agencies at the national level in different countries: 
 National Emergency Management Agency (Australia)
 National Emergency Management Agency (South Korea)
 National Emergency Management Agency (Mongolia)
 National Emergency Management Agency (Nigeria)
 National Emergency Management Agency (New Zealand)

See also
 Federal Emergency Management Agency, in the United States 
 Ministry of Emergency Situations (disambiguation), in former Soviet countries